Grand Principality of Rus' (Ukrainian: Велике Князівство Руське, Polish: Wielkie Księstwo Ruskie), also known in historiography as Grand Principality of Ruthenia, was the project of the state as a member of the Polish–Lithuanian Commonwealth in the territory of Kiev Voivodeship, Bracław Voivodeship and Chernihiv Voivodeship. Its creation was proposed by Hetman Ivan Vyhovsky with Yuri Nemyrych and Pavlo Teteria in September 1658 during the negotiations between the Cossack Hetmanate and the Commonwealth. The project of the Duchy was approved in the first version of the Treaty of Hadiach, but later, because of the strong resistance of Polish society, the idea of the Grand Principality of Rus was completely abandoned. The Cossacks were very disappointed with the final version of the treaty and The Ruin began. Yuri Nemirich, the alleged author of the Grand Principality of Rus project, was killed in a local fight in August 1659 and Vyhovsky lost his power in October 1659, thus the project did not become a reality.

See also 
 Treaty of Hadiach

References

Sources 
 Piotr Kroll, Od ugody hadziackiej do Cudnowa. Kozaczyzna między Rzecząpospolitą a Moskwą w latach 1658–1660, Warszawa: Wydawnictwa Uniwersytetu Warszawskiego, 2008.
 Mariusz Robert Drozdowski (2015): Rzeczypospolita wobec idei odnowienia unii hadziackiej w latach 1660–1682

External links 
 Janusz Tazbir, Jak Polska Ukrainę straciła w Polityka 4 listopada 2009;
 HADZIACZ
 HERBY ZIEMSKIE RZECZYPOSPOLITEJ
 Stosunki polsko-rosyjskie w XVI i XVII wieku
 cyclop.com.ua ВЕЛИКЕ КНЯЗІВСТВО РУСЬКЕ
 gazeta.ua Великим Князівством Руським Україна побула півроку

Geographic history of Ukraine
1658 in the Polish–Lithuanian Commonwealth
17th century in Ukraine
Ruthenians in the Polish–Lithuanian Commonwealth
Proposed countries
Former monarchies of Europe